Günther Irmscher (1937 – 9 February 1996) was a German Rallye driver and entrepreneur. In 1968 he founded the company Irmscher Automobilbau in Winnenden near Stuttgart, South Germany. The first time they made tuning parts for Opel cars. He started with Opel Kadett (1977), then Opel Manta (1983), Opel Senator, Opel Omega (both 1990).

Irmscher was the winner of the Deutsche Tourenwagen Meisterschaft in 1965 on NSU Prinz TT. 1967 he was the winner of the Rallye Tour d’Europe, also on NSU Prinz TT.

References

German company founders
20th-century German businesspeople
German racing drivers
1937 births
1996 deaths